The 2015–16 Southeastern Louisiana Lions basketball team represented Southeastern Louisiana University during the 2015–16 NCAA Division I men's basketball season. The Lions, led by second year head coach Jay Ladner, played their home games at the University Center and were members of the Southland Conference. They finished the season 12–21, 9–9 in Southland play to finish in sixth place. They defeated New Orleans in the first round of the Southland tournament to advance to the quarterfinals where they lost to Houston Baptist.

Preseason
The Lions were picked to finish seventh (7th) in both the Southland Conference Coaches' Poll and the Sports Information Directors Poll.

Roster

Schedule
Source

|-
!colspan=9 style="background:#006847; color: white;"| Exhibition

|-
!colspan=9 style="background:#006643; color:white;"| Non-conference

|-
|-
!colspan=9 style="background:#006643; color:white;"|Southland regular season

|-
!colspan=9 style="background:#006847; color:white;"| Southland tournament

See also
2015–16 Southeastern Louisiana Lady Lions basketball team

References

Southeastern Louisiana Lions basketball seasons
Southeastern Louisiana
2015 in sports in Louisiana
2016 in sports in Louisiana